"A Question of Priorities" is the fifth episode aired of the first series of UFO - a 1970 British television science fiction series about an alien invasion of Earth. Tony Barwick wrote the screenplay and it was directed by David Lane. The episode was filmed between 28 July and 7 August 1969 and aired on the ATV Midlands network on 14 October 1970. Though shown as the fifth episode, it was actually the eighth to have been filmed.

The series was created by Gerry Anderson and Sylvia Anderson with Reg Hill, and produced by the Andersons and Lew Grade's Century 21 Productions for Grade's ITC Entertainment company.

Story
Commander Edward Straker's son Johnny is hit by a car and taken to hospital. Straker arrives at the hospital with his ex-wife, Mary, to find that Johnny is allergic to the antibiotics the hospital has available - Straker uses his position to order an experimental anti-allergenic antibiotic to be flown from New York to Britain by a SHADO transport.

In Ireland, an alien escapes from a crashing UFO and starts transmitting from the home of an elderly blind woman. The transmissions are intercepted by SHADO HQ and Col. Alec E. Freeman diverts the transport aircraft, unaware that it is carrying the antibiotics, to investigate the signals.

When Straker discovers this change of schedule he knows that he cannot order the transport to Britain as his duty to SHADO overrides any personal needs. But Mary challenges Straker when he tells her the transport is being delayed because of "a more important matter".

SHADO mobiles carried by the transport are sent to investigate the alien transmissions but before the mobiles can make contact, another UFO arrives and kills the alien: it appears that he was trying to defect. The transport then continues on to Britain and Straker rushes to the hospital with the antibiotics but it proves too late as his son has died, with a tearful Mary saying that she never wants to see her ex-husband again.

Cast

Starring
 Ed Bishop — Commander Edward Straker
 George Sewell — Col. Alec E. Freeman
 Gabrielle Drake — Lt. Gay Ellis
 Peter Gordeno — Capt. Peter Carlin
 Dolores Mantez — Lt. Nina Barry
 Gary Myers — Capt. Lew Waterman
 Keith Alexander — Lt. Keith Ford
 Ayshea — Lt. Ayshea Johnson
 Norma Ronald — Miss Ealand

Also Starring
 Philip Madoc — Steven Rutland

Featuring
 Suzanne Neve — Mary Rutland	
 Mary Merrall — Mrs. O'Connor	
 Barnaby Shaw — John Rutland	
 Peter Halliday — Dr. Segal	
 Russell Napier — Dr. Green	
 Richard Aylen — Alien	
 Andrea Allan — Nurse	
 David Cargill — Car driver	
 Penny Spencer — SHADO operative

Production notes
Philip Madoc, who played Steven Rutland, Straker's ex-wife's new husband, was another actor to have also appeared in Doppelgänger.

Locations included Pinewood Studios, Buckinghamshire and Neptune House at ATV Elstree Studios, Borehamwood.

References

External links

1970 British television episodes
UFO (TV series) episodes